Legowelt (real name Danny Wolfers) is a Dutch composer, electronic musician and visual artist, whose music spawns a varying range of sub-genres.

Life 
Danny Wolfers was born in The Hague, The Netherlands and grew up in the coastal neighbourhood of Scheveningen.

Career

Music 

Around 1999, Legowelt started releasing a number of LPs and EPs on The Hague's Bunker Records. Bunker released Legowelt's first vinyl album Pimpshifter.

In 2002, the German music magazine Groove voted Legowelt's Disco Rout track of the year. Disco Rout was originally released on a Ghostly International compilation, and was subsequently licensed by Cocoon Recordings for a full vinyl release.

Apart from producing, Legowelt tours and performs all over the world.

Strange Life Records and Nightwind Records 
In 2004, Wolfers founded record label Strange Life Records, self-releasing under the Legowelt moniker, but also various aliases such as Smackos, Franz Falckenhaus and Klaus Weltman. Strange Life Records also released albums and EPs by artists including DJ Overdose, DMX Krew and Ian Martin. Strange Life Records was operative until 2010.

In 2014, Wolfers founded Nightwind Records "releasing cassettes, cd’s, digital, graphic novels, zines and vinyl LP’s".

Aliases 
Danny Wolfers has released albums and EP's under over 40 different aliases including: Alchemulator, Bontempi 666, Calimex Mental Implant Corp., Commanding The Beast, Coverti World, Danny Wolfers, Dickie Smabers & Moerwijk Crew, Florenza Mavelli, Franz Falckenhaus, Gladio, House Of Jezebel, Klaus Weltman, Lords Of Midnite, Nacho Patrol, Nomad Ninja, Occult Orientated Crime, Phalangius, Polarius, Ray Escortienda, Rising Sun Systems, Saab Knutson, Salamandos, Sammy Osmo, Satomi Taniyama, Seaside Houz Boyz, Smackos, Squadra Blanco, Star Shepherd, Tandy Ogmo, The Psychic Stewardess, Twilight Moose, Ufocus, Venom 18, and Westside Box Savants.

Astro Unicorn Radio 
From 2007-2011, Danny Wolfers hosted a radio show titled Astro Unicorn Radio which aired on Intergalactic FM. The show featured obscure music and interviews with artists such as Ron Morelli, founder of L.I.E.S., and Veronica Vasicka, founder of Minimal Wave Records.

Shadow Wolf Cyberzine 
Since 2014 Danny Wolfers publishes every year an online cyberzine written in ASCII which features articles, reviews, DIY manuals, studios tips, music interviews, games and ASCII art by Danny Wolfers and guest contributors. The Shadow Wolf Cyberzine is published yearly around the end of the year. In 2020 and 2021, compilation 'cover tapes' were released alongside the Shadow Wolf Cyberzine featuring several artists including Acidic Male, Dim Garden, Baglover, Alina Valentina, DJ Overdose, Franziska Lantz, Huren, Chupacabras, Jentlemen, and Elektrovolt. The term ‘cover tape’ stems from 1980's and 1990's magazine culture when printed magazines came with a cassette or CD containing music or software.

Artwork 
Danny Wolfers produces paintings and drawings which have been used for his music releases and which have been exhibited.

In 2016 Danny Wolfers held a drawing competition centred around the theme of "the world of Nightwind Records" with as a first prize a vintage 1987 Yahama PSS 570 FM synthesizer, and other prizes including Legowelt CDs, tapes, t-shirt, and stickers. In 2021, another drawing competition was held, which had as prizes a Casio SK1 sampling keyboard, a Yamaha PSS 380 FM synthesizer, and an electro acoustic kalimba, among other prizes. All art entries were published on the Legowelt official website.

In 2017 Danny Wolfers published a 24-page printed graphic novel, accompanying the album Unfolding the Future with Amateur Space Jazz released under the name Danny Wolfers. 

In 2022, Danny Wolfers collaborated with internet artist Rafael Rozendaal on Polychrome Music by designing a "generative music system that plays an infinite composition on 3 different audio channels, each with their own synthesizer". Polychrome Music was published on 24 August 2022 on Artblocks.

Animation 
In 2021 Danny Wolfers founded Nightwind Animation Studios, through which he produced and published his first full-length animation titled "Ambient Trip Commander". Ambient Trip Commander premiered on 7 May 2022 at the Eye Film Museum in Amsterdam and has been screened in several venues with live soundtracking by Legowelt. The running time is 65 minutes of original frame-by-frame animation hand drawn by Danny Wolfers using watercolours and fineliners. Ambient Trip Commander took 14 months to complete.

References

External links
 Official website
 Discogs discography

Living people
Legowelt
Musicians from The Hague
Year of birth missing (living people)